The 2016 IAAF World Challenge was the seventh edition of the annual, global circuit of one-day track and field competitions organized by the International Association of Athletics Federations (IAAF). The series featured a total of twelve meetings – one fewer than the previous year as the Ponce Grand Prix de Atletismo and Meeting de Rabat were dropped while the Grande Premio Brasil Caixa de Atletismo returned. The Rieti Meeting was originally scheduled for 11 September, but the meeting folded due to financial issues.

Schedule

References

External links
Official website

2016
World Challenge Meetings